Santiago Silva may refer to:

 Santiago Silva (footballer, born 1980), Uruguayan football forward for Aldosivi
 Santiago Silva (footballer, born 1990), Uruguayan football forward for César Vallejo